Arno Rink (26 September 1940 – 5 September 2017) was a German painter. He was accepted to the Hochschule für Grafik und Buchkunst Leipzig (HGB) in 1962 and studied under Werner Tübke, Hans Mayer-Foreyt and Harry Blume. He is associated with the second generation of the Leipzig School, which paints in a German figurative tradition.

Rink started to teach at the HGB in 1979 and was its headmaster from 1987 to 1995. He taught several prominent painters from the New Leipzig School, such as Neo Rauch, Tilo Baumgärtel, Michael Triegel, Tim Eitel, David Schnell and Christoph Ruckhäberle.

References

1940 births
2017 deaths
20th-century German painters
20th-century German male artists
21st-century German painters
21st-century German male artists
German contemporary artists
German male painters
People from Unstrut-Hainich-Kreis
Academic staff of the Hochschule für Grafik und Buchkunst Leipzig